Micajah Pickett "Micah" Caskey IV (born June 2, 1981) is an American politician. He currently serves in the South Carolina House of Representatives, representing the 89th district. Caskey was first elected in 2016 defeating Democrat Peggy Butler and Constitution Party candidate Robert Lampley, winning over 62% of the vote. Prior to working in the South Carolina legislature, Caskey worked as the Assistant Solicitor for the 11th Circuit (2014–2016), and also served in the United States Marine Corps (2003–2013), where he would achieve the rank of captain.

Early life and education
Caskey was born in Columbia, South Carolina, to parents Micajah III, and Rebecca Anne Caskey. He grew up in the Springdale, South Carolina,  and graduated from Dutch Fork High School in 1999. While in high school, he earned Eagle Scout  honors and was also a state champion wrestler. He attended the University of Florida on a full scholarship and graduated in 2003. Later, he attended law school at the University of South Carolina, where he also earned a master's degree in International Business. In September 2017, Caskey was nominated and selected as a member of the Leadership South Carolina class of 2018. Caskey was also selected to South Carolina Bar Leadership Academy Class of 2018.

Career

Marine Corps (2003–2013)
Caskey served as an officer in the U.S. Marine Corps. He earned the rank of Captain and commanded both company and platoon-sized units during his two combat tours in Iraq, while on active duty. Caskey left active duty to pursue graduate degrees in International Business and law at the University of South Carolina. Later, in 2009, Caskey volunteered to leave law school for a year to command a small team of specialized Marines in Afghanistan, his third combat tour of duty. Caskey's work in Helmand Province, Afghanistan was highlighted by New York Times Magazine writer Dexter Filkins in the article, "Stanley McChrystal's Long War". Caskey's work was also covered in the Reuters, and Freedom Files, which outlined 
efforts to develop a wheat distribution centers in  Helmand Province, Afghanistan. Following his deployment in Afghanistan, Caskey returned to the school to complete his Juris Doctor and master's degree in International Business, and, subsequently, went to work as a consultant for Fortune 100 companies. He formally ended his service in the Marine Corps in 2013.

Assistant Solicitor (2014–2016)
In 2014, Caskey went to work in the 11th Judicial Circuit Solicitor's office , the equivalent of a district attorney's office, in Lexington County, South Carolina. While working as a prosecutor, Caskey prosecuted felony crimes, most notably, high-profile cases involving drug trafficking, child homicide, sexual assaults on children, and murder. Because the state constitution prohibits serving as a prosecutor and as a legislator, after being elected to the South Carolina House of Representatives in 2016, Caskey left the Solicitor's office and opened a private practice in West Columbia.

Representative (2017–present)
S.C. Rep. Caskey was elected to the South Carolina House of Representatives on November 8, 2016.  On November 18, 2016, he was selected by other representatives to lead the Freshman Caucus. Caskey was appointed to the Judiciary Committee by Speaker of the House Jay Lucas and his first official term began on January 10, 2017. Caskey received praise for his criticism of Governor Henry McMaster's leadership on key infrastructure legislation. Much of Caskey's first term as a legislator was outlined and featured in the Council for State Government's "Freshman Orientation".

Nuclear construction debacle/utility company scandal
In the summer of 2017, in response to the VC Summer Crisis, Caskey lead the formation of the bipartisan Energy Caucus. During the fall of 2017, Caskey was appointed by the Speaker to the House Utility Ratepayer Protection Committee. In the 2018 legislative session, Caskey  remained vocal in criticizing SCANA and others. He vocalized his support for H.4375, which called for the repeal of the Base Load Review Act, citing that he was not willing to allow SCANA to continue to charge ratepayers and benefit from the failed project. The bill passed the House on January 31, 2017.

Committee assignments
 Judicial
 Legislative Oversight

References

Republican Party members of the South Carolina House of Representatives
1981 births
Politicians from Columbia, South Carolina
Living people
People from West Columbia, South Carolina
Lawyers from Columbia, South Carolina
21st-century American politicians